The 1922 Beijing-Han Airlines crash occurred when a Handley Page O/7 on a tour flight crashed during landing at Beijing Nanyuan Airport in 1922. It was China's first fatal commercial passenger aircraft contingency.

Background
The flight was a three-day-trial tour operated by the Chinese Government (Republic of China) from March 19 to March 31, 1922, under the brand “Beijing-Han Airlines”. The flight and tour was initiated by Chinese warlord Cao Kun. The flight was piloted by Ma Yufang.

Accident
The aircraft was landing at Beijing Nanyuan Airport after completing a three-day-trial tour, after 10 o'clock. During landing, the aircraft's tail struck trees and crashed, catching fire. All 14 occupants on board were killed. The crash was China's first commercial passenger aircraft accident.

References

1922 in China
Aviation accidents and incidents in China
Aviation accidents and incidents in 1922
History of Beijing